Paul Fenton may refer to:

Paul Fenton (musician) (born 1946), English drummer
Paul Fenton (ice hockey) (born 1959), American ice hockey forward